Mario Stefel (born 8 February 1996) is an Austrian footballer who plays for Liechtensteiner club USV Eschen/Mauren.

Career

SV Horn
On 9 July 2019 SV Horn confirmed, that they had signed Stefel from SC Wiener Neustadt.

SCR Altach
On 10 July 2020 he signed with SC Rheindorf Altach.

Dornbirn
On 31 January 2022, Stefel joined Dornbirn until the end of the season.

References

External links
 
 

1996 births
Living people
Austrian footballers
Association football midfielders
SC Wiener Neustadt players
SV Horn players
SC Rheindorf Altach players
FC Dornbirn 1913 players
USV Eschen/Mauren players
Austrian Football Bundesliga players
2. Liga (Austria) players
Swiss 1. Liga (football) players
Austrian expatriate footballers
Expatriate footballers in Liechtenstein
Austrian expatriate sportspeople in Liechtenstein